Juki-ye Vosta (also Romanized as Jūkī-ye Vosţá; also known as Chūgī-ye Vasaţ and Jūgī-ye Vasaţ) is a village in Quri Chay-ye Gharbi Rural District, Saraju District, Maragheh County, East Azerbaijan Province, Iran. At the 2006 census, its population was 68, in 16 families.

References 

Towns and villages in Maragheh County